Sichuan Road and Bridge Group (abbreviated as SRBG) is a Chinese engineering company that builds civil works in domestic and international projects.

International projects
Most of the company's business is in China but it also carries out work in Eritrea, Norway, Tanzania, Cambodia, and the United Arab Emirates.

The company has had an especially long standing relationship with Eritrea with both Chinese and Eritrea officials calling the company a positive force in bilateral relations.  In Eritrea it has built several major civil works including roads and hospitals and employs 3,000 local employees.

 Awarded in 2013 a €93 million contract to build the steelwork for the 1553 meter long Hålogaland Bridge in Norway to be completed in 2017. It was completed in December 2018 after a delay.
 6 projects in Eritrea starting from 1996 including the Massawa Municipal Road Works (1996); Asmara Municipal Road Works (2004); Massawa Seawall Road Rehabilitation Project (2005); Asmara Optical Hospital Improvement Project (2011); Eritrean Technology College Improvement & Extension Project (2012); and Eritrean Agriculture College Improvement & Extension Project (2012). Work had been disrupted by the outbreak of the Eritrean–Ethiopian War but the company continued involvement in the country.

Mining
The company is also involved in gold mining in Eritrea. Through its subsidiary, Sichuan Road & Bridge Mining Investment Development Corp. Ltd., purchased a 60% stake in gold mining asset from Sunridge Gold for $US65 million in November 2015.

References

Construction and civil engineering companies of China
Companies based in Sichuan